Jason Krywulak (born January 29, 1972) is a Canadian retired professional ice hockey and roller hockey player.

Playing career
Krywulak played major junior in the Western Hockey League (WHL) with the Medicine Hat Tigers and Swift Current Broncos, winning the Four Broncos Memorial Trophy as player of the year in 1993.  His 162 points led the WHL and CHL in scoring to earn the Bob Clarke Trophy and CHL Top Scorer Award.  After a four-year WHL career, Krywulak began a three-year stint with the University of Calgary in the Canada West Universities Athletic Association (CWUAA).  During this time, he also joined short-lived Roller Hockey International (RHI) league, where he played for four seasons with the Calgary Radz, San Diego Barracudas, Oakland Skates and Sacramento River Rats.

Krywulak turned pro during the 1997–98 season, playing in 3 games with the San Diego Gulls of the minor professional West Coast Hockey League (WCHL).  The following season, he went overseas to play in the now-defunct German 1st league with EC Timmendorfer Strand.  He led the team in scoring with 116 points in 49 games.  He then split the 1999–00 season between EHC Straubing of the German Oberliga and EHC Neuwied of the 2nd Bundesliga before retiring.

Awards
Won the Four Broncos Memorial Trophy in 1993
Won the Bob Clarke Trophy in 1993
 WHL East First All-Star Team – 1993
Won the CHL Top Scorer Award in 1993
Named to the Canadian Hockey League (CHL) Second All-Star Team in 1993

Career statistics

References

External links

1972 births
Living people
Medicine Hat Tigers players
Calgary Rad'z players
Ice hockey people from Saskatchewan
San Diego Barracudas players
Oakland Skates players
Sacramento River Rats players
Swift Current Broncos players
University of Calgary alumni
Canadian ice hockey forwards
Sportspeople from Prince Albert, Saskatchewan
San Diego Gulls (WCHL) players